Zombie Influx is the twelfth release by Nox Arcana as a collaboration with Jeff Hartz of Buzz-Works. The theme of this album centers on a zombie invasion with the use of frantic emergency news broadcasts reminiscent of H.G. Wells' The War of the Worlds, mixed with sound effects and ominous music.

The album was written and performed by Jeff Hartz and Joseph Vargo.
Produced by Joseph Vargo. Engineered by William Piotrowski.

Track listing
 "Ground Zero" — 3:15
 "Satellite Radiation" — 2:26
 "Defcon Six" — 1:42
 "Creeping Death" — 2:23
 "Echoes of the Living" — 2:19
 "Doomsday" — 2:26
 "The Feeding" — 1:58
 "Warning Signs" — 0:44
 "The Dawn" — 3:32
 "Dead Run" — 2:11
 "Post Mortem" — 2:28
 "The Panic Spreads" — 0:33
 "Transmutation" — 2:32
 "The Pain of Dying" — 2:38
 "Armageddon" — 2:53
 "Dead Life" — 2:26
 "Flesh Eaters" — 3:04
 "Ravenous" — 2:50
 "Zombie Influx" — 2:48

References

External links 
 
 Zombie-works website
[ Zombie Influx] at Allmusic

Nox Arcana albums
2009 albums
Zombies and revenants in popular culture